Ifish is a fishing show hosted by Paul Worsteling. It airs on both Network Ten and digital multi-channel One.

See also

 Fishing television series

References

External links
 

Network 10 original programming
10 Bold original programming
Lifestyle (Australian TV channel) original programming
Fishing television series
Recreational fishing in Australia
2009 Australian television series debuts
2010s Australian television series
English-language television shows